The Yorkshire Amateur Association Football League is an amateur competitive football league based in  West Yorkshire, England. The league has a total of eight divisions, the highest of which is the Yorkshire Amateur League Supreme Division, which sits at level 11 of the English football league system. It is a feeder to the Northern Counties East Football League.

In the 2008–09 season, Gildersome Spurs Old Boys made the record books by winning all four of the competitions they entered, including Senior B, the Terry Marflitt Trophy, the Yorkshire Old Boys Shield, and the Wheatley District Cup.

The League runs three League Cup competitions annually. The Terry Marflitt Trophy is contested by teams in the Premier Division, Championship and Division One. The Hancock Cup is contested by teams in Division Two and Division Three. The Hodgson Cup is contested by teams in Division Four and Division Five.

The Yorkshire Amateur Association Football League received FA Charter Standard status in the 2017-18 season and celebrated being in existence for 90 years. As part of these celebrations, the finals for the Terry Marflitt Trophy and Hancock Cup were held at South Leeds Stadium. 

Before the 2019–20 season, the Yorkshire League was admitted to Step 7 of the National League System (NLS) after creating the Supreme Division, which took in seven clubs from the dissolved West Riding County Amateur Football League. The league's top division succeeded its former West Riding County League counterpart at that step, which was abolished ahead of the next season and replaced with the designation Regional NLS Feeder Leagues.

Member clubs 2022–23
Supreme Division
Alwoodley
Athletico
Bradford United
Calverley United
Farsley Celtic Juniors
Leeds City
Leeds Medics & Dentists
Leeds University
Littletown
Lower Hopton
Middleton
Route One Rovers
Ryburn United
Stanley United
Wortley

Premier Division

Beeston Juniors | Collegians | Ealandians | Gildersome Spurs Old Boys | Golcar United | Greetland AFC | Leeds City Reserves | Lepton Highlanders | Morley Town AFC | Nostell M.W.  | Route One Rovers Reserves | Shire Academics | Woodkirk Valley

Championship

Bradford United Reserves | Colton Athletic | Ealandians Reserves | Hanging Heaton | Huddersfield Amateur | Idle | Leeds Independent | Leeds Medics & Dentists Reserves | Leeds Modernians | Middleton Park | Middleton Reserves | Norristhorpe | Wortley Reserves

Division One

Alwoodley Reserves | Fairbank United | Farsley Celtic Juniors Reserves | Gomersal & Cleckheaton | Horsforth St. Margaret's | Leeds City III | Littletown Reserves | Ryburn United Reserves | Savile United | Shire Academics Reserves | Stanningley Old Boys | Tyersal

Division Two

Athletico Reserves | Bradford Olympic | Leeds Medics & Dentists III | Marsden | Mount St Marys | Norristhorpe Reserves | North Huddersfield | Salts | St. Bedes AFC | Thornesians | Trinity & All Saints Old Boys | White Rose

Division Three

Birstall Rovers | Calverley United Reserves | Colton Athletic Reserves | Dewsbury Rangers | Farnley Sports | Garforth Rangers | Gildersome Spurs Old Boys Reserves | Leeds Modernians Reserves | North Leeds | Ryburn United Academy I | Woodkirk Valley Reserves | Wortley III

Division Four

Beeston Juniors Reserves | Bradford United III | Ealandians III | Leeds City IV | Leeds Modernians III | Lepton Highlanders Reserves | Methley United | Middleton Park Reserves | Morley Town AFC Reserves | Old Centralians | Shire Academics III

Division Five

Collegians Reserves | Colton Athletic III | Dewsbury Rangers Reserves | Hanging Heaton Reserves | Hebden Bridge Saints | Huddersfield Amateur Reserves | Idle Reserves | North Leeds Reserves | Old Centralians Reserves | St. Bedes AFC Reserves | Shire Academics IV | Thornesians Reserves

Champions 
Recent divisional champions

References

External links
Official website
FA Full-Time website
Gildersome Spurs Old Boys FC official website
Old Centralians AFC official website

Amateur association football
Football leagues in England
Football in West Yorkshire
Sports leagues established in 1928
1928 establishments in England